Wong Peak is a peak 1.6 nautical miles (3.0 km) northeast of the summit of Mount Bird in northwest Ross Island. The feature rises to over 1600 m. Named by New Zealand Geographic Board (NZGB) (2000) after Frank Wong.

Mountains of Ross Island